Alexander Sims may refer to:

Alexander D. Sims (1803–1848), U.S. Representative from South Carolina
Alexander Sims (racing driver) (born 1988), British racing driver